Myrcia albobrunnea is a species of plant in the family Myrtaceae. It is endemic to Peru.

References

Endemic flora of Peru
albobrunnea
Vulnerable plants
Taxonomy articles created by Polbot